The Charlevoix Courier is the weekly newspaper of Charlevoix, Michigan. The paper publishes weekly on Fridays.

History 
The Charlevoix Courier was founded in 1883. In 2006, the paper, along with its sister publications the Petoskey News-Review and the Gaylord Herald Times, was purchased by Schurz Communications of South Bend, Indiana. In 2019, it was sold to GateHouse Media.

References

External links
 

Newspapers published in Michigan
Charlevoix County, Michigan
Publications established in 1883
Gannett publications